This is a list of films which placed number-one at the weekend box office in Brazil during 2021.

Highest-grossing films

References

2021 in Brazil
2021
Brazil